Diego Martín Meijide Blanco (born May 9, 1976, in Montevideo) is a Spanish Association football player, currently (as of 2012) playing for CD Eldense in Tercera División - Group 6.

In the 2007–08 season he played for Real Oviedo, the champions of the region of Asturias (winners of the Trofeo Principado in 2007).

Signed from F.C. Torrevieja, with whom he played for five seasons, he was player of the season at that club in all five of those seasons.
He is the main position central defender.
In July 2012, he signed for CD Eldense.

Honours and awards
Promotion to Primera División Uruguaya: 1998 Deportivo Maldonado (Promotion/relegation playoff winner)

External links
 Profile at tenfieldigital.com.uy

1976 births
Living people
Footballers from Montevideo
Uruguayan footballers
Uruguayan people of Spanish descent
Miramar Misiones players
Deportivo Maldonado players
C.A. Bella Vista players
Real Oviedo players
Tianjin Jinmen Tiger F.C. players
Panserraikos F.C. players
Uruguayan expatriate sportspeople in China
Uruguayan expatriate sportspeople in Greece
Uruguayan expatriate sportspeople in Spain
CD Torrevieja players
Association football defenders
Uruguayan expatriate footballers